This is a list of the genera currently recognised in the fly family Tachinidae.

A

Abepalpus Townsend, 1931
Acantholespesia Wood, 1987
Acaulona van der Wulp, 1884
Acemya Robineau-Desvoidy, 1830
Acroceronia Cortés, 1951
Acronacantha van der Wulp, 1891
Actia Robineau-Desvoidy, 1830
Actinochaeta Brauer & von Bergenstamm, 1889
Actinochaetopteryx Townsend, 1927
Actinodoria Townsend, 1927
Actinominthella Townsend, 1928
Actinoplagia Blanchard, 1940
Acuphoceropsis Blanchard, 1943
Adejeania Townsend, 1913
Admontia Brauer & von Bergenstamm, 1889
Aesia Richter, 2011
Afrolixa Curran, 1939
Afrophylax Cerretti & O’Hara in O’Hara & Cerretti, 2016
Agaedioxenis Villeneuve, 1939
Agicuphocera Townsend, 1915
Aglummyia Townsend, 1912
Aldrichiopa Guimarães, 1971
Aldrichomyia Özdikmen, 2006
Alexogloblinia Cortés, 1945
Allelomyia González, 1992
Allophorocera Hendel, 1901
Alloprosopaea Villeneuve, 1923
Allosturmia Blanchard, 1958
Allothelaira Villeneuve, 1915
Alpinoplagia Townsend, 1931
Alsomyia Brauer & von Bergenstamm, 1891
Alsopsyche Brauer & von Bergenstamm, 1891
Altaia Malloch, 1938
Amazohoughia Townsend, 1934
Amblychaeta Aldrich, 1934
Amelibaea Mesnil, 1955
Amesiomima Mesnil, 1950
Ametadoria Townsend, 1927
Amicrotrichomma Townsend, 1927
Amnonia Kugler, 1971
Amphibolia Macquart, 1843
Amphicestonia Villeneuve, 1939
Amphitropesa Townsend, 1933
Anacamptomyia Bischof, 1904
Anadiscalia Curran, 1934
Anadistichona Townsend, 1934
Anaeudora Townsend, 1933
Anagonia Brauer & von Bergenstamm, 1891
Anamastax Brauer & von Bergenstamm, 1891
Anametopochaeta Townsend, 1919
Ancistrophora Schiner, 1865
Andesimyia Brèthes, 1909
Andinomyia Townsend, 1912
Androsoma Cortés & Campos, 1971
Anechuromyia Mesnil & Shima, 1979
Anemorilla Townsend, 1915
Aneogmena Brauer & von Bergenstamm, 1891
Anepalpus Townsend, 1931
Angustia Sellers, 1943
Anisia van der Wulp, 1890
Anomalostomyia Cerretti & Barraclough, 2007
Anoxynops Townsend, 1927
Anthomyiopsis Townsend, 1916
Antistasea Bischof, 1904
Antistaseopsis Townsend, 1934
Anurophylla Villeneuve, 1938
Apalpostoma Malloch, 1930
Apatemyia Macquart, 1846
Aphria Robineau-Desvoidy, 1830
Aplomya Robineau-Desvoidy, 1830
Aplomyodoria Townsend, 1928
Aplomyopsis Townsend, 1927
Apomorphomyia Crosskey, 1984
Aporeomyia Pape & Shima, 1993
Aprotheca Macquart, 1851
Arama Richter, 1972
Araucogonia Cortés, 1976
Araucosimus Aldrich, 1934
Archytas Jaennicke, 1867
Archytoepalpus Townsend, 1927
Arcona Richter, 1988
Arctosoma Aldrich, 1934
Argyrochaetona Townsend, 1919
Argyromima Brauer & von Bergenstamm, 1889
Argyrophylax Brauer & von Bergenstamm, 1889
Argyrothelaira Townsend, 1916
Aridalia Curran, 1934
Arrhenomyza Malloch, 1929
Arrhinactia Townsend, 1927
Asetulia Malloch, 1938
Asilidotachina Townsend, 1931
Asseclamyia Reinhard, 1956
Atacta Schiner, 1868
Atactopsis Townsend, 1917
Atactosturmia Townsend, 1915
Ateloglossa Coquillett, 1899
Ateloglutus Aldrich, 1934
Athrycia Robineau-Desvoidy, 1830
Atlantomyia Crosskey, 1977
Atractocerops Townsend, 1916
Atrichiopoda Townsend, 1931
Atylomyia Brauer, 1898
Atylostoma Brauer & von Bergenstamm, 1889
Aulacephala Macquart, 1851
Austeniops Townsend, 1915
Australotachina Curran, 1938
Austromacquartia Townsend, 1934
Austronilea Crosskey, 1967
Austrophasiopsis Townsend, 1933
Austrophorocera Townsend, 1916
Austrophryno Townsend, 1916
Austrophytomyptera Blanchard, 1962
Austrosolieria Cerretti & O’Hara in O’Hara & Cerretti, 2016
Avibrissia Malloch, 1932
Avibrissina Malloch, 1932
Avibrissosturmia Townsend, 1927
Azygobothria Townsend, 1911

B

Bactromyia Brauer & von Bergenstamm, 1891
Bactromyiella Mesnil, 1952
Bahrettinia Özdikmen, 2007
Balde Rice, 2005
Bampura Tschorsnig, 1983
Barychaeta Bezzi, 1906
Bathydexia van der Wulp, 1891
Baumhaueria Meigen, 1838
Belida Robineau-Desvoidy, 1863
Bellina Robineau-Desvoidy, 1863
Belvosia Robineau-Desvoidy, 1830
Belvosiella Curran, 1934
Belvosiomimops Townsend, 1935
Beskia Brauer & von Bergenstamm, 1889
Beskiocephala Townsend, 1916
Beskioleskia Townsend, 1919
Bessa Robineau-Desvoidy, 1863
Besseria Robineau-Desvoidy, 1830
Bezziomyiobia Baranov, 1938
Bibiomima Brauer & von Bergenstamm, 1889
Billaea Robineau-Desvoidy, 1830
Binghamimyia Townsend, 1919
Biomeigenia Mesnil, 1961
Bischofimyia Townsend, 1927
Bithia Robineau-Desvoidy, 1863
Blepharella Macquart, 1851
Blepharellina Mesnil, 1952
Blephariatacta Townsend, 1931
Blepharipa Rondani, 1856
Blepharomyia Brauer & von Bergenstamm, 1889
Blepharopoda Rondani, 1850
Blondelia Robineau-Desvoidy, 1830
Bogosia Rondani, 1873
Bolbochaeta Bigot, 1885
Bolohoughia Townsend, 1927
Bombyliomyia Brauer & von Bergenstamm, 1889
Borgmeiermyia Townsend, 1935
Bothria Rondani, 1856
Bothrophora Schiner, 1868
Botriopsis Townsend, 1928
Bourquinia Blanchard, 1935
Brachelia Robineau-Desvoidy, 1830
Bracheliopsis van Emden, 1960
Brachybelvosia Townsend, 1927
Brachychaeta Rondani, 1861
Brachychaetoides Mesnil, 1970
Brachycnephalia Townsend, 1927
Brachymasicera Townsend, 1911
Brachymera Brauer & von Bergenstamm, 1889
Bracteola Richter, 1972
Brasilomyia Özdikmen, 2010 
Brullaea Robineau-Desvoidy, 1863
Buquetia Robineau-Desvoidy, 1847

C

Cadurcia Villeneuve, 1926
Cadurciella Villeneuve, 1927
Caeniopsis Townsend, 1927
Caenisomopsis Townsend, 1934
Cahenia Verbeke, 1960
Calcager Hutton, 1901
Calcageria Curran, 1927
Calliethilla Shima, 1979
Callotroxis Aldrich, 1929
Calocarcelia Townsend, 1927
Calodexia van der Wulp, 1891
Calohystricia Townsend, 1931
Calolydella Townsend, 1927
Calosia Malloch, 1938
Calotachina Malloch, 1938
Calozenillia Townsend, 1927
Caltagironea Cortés & Campos, 1974
Calyptromyia Villeneuve, 1915
Camarona van der Wulp, 1891
Camposiana Townsend, 1915
Camposodes Cortés, 1967
Camptophryno Townsend, 1927
Campylia Malloch, 1938
Campylocheta Rondani, 1859
Cantrellius Barraclough, 1992
Carbonilla Mesnil, 1974
Carcelia Robineau-Desvoidy, 1830
Carceliathrix Cerretti & O’Hara in O’Hara & Cerretti, 2016
Carceliella Baranov, 1934
Carcelimyia Mesnil, 1944
Carcelina Mesnil, 1944
Carceliocephala Townsend, 1934
Carceliodoria Townsend, 1928
Carmodymyia Thompson, 1968
Casahuiria Townsend, 1919
Catagonia Brauer & von Bergenstamm, 1891
Catajurinia Townsend, 1927
Catapariprosopa Townsend, 1927
Catena Richter, 1975
Catharosia Rondani, 1868
Cavalieria Villeneuve, 1908
Cavillatrix Richter, 1986
Celatoria Coquillett, 1890
Ceracia Rondani, 1865
Ceratochaetops Mesnil, 1970
Ceratometopa Townsend, 1931
Ceromasia Rondani, 1856
Ceromasiopsis Townsend, 1927
Ceromya Robineau-Desvoidy, 1830
Cerotachina Arnaud, 1963
Cesaperua Koçak & Kemal, 2010
Cestonia Rondani, 1861
Cestonionerva Villeneuve, 1929
Cestonioptera Villeneuve, 1939
Chaetexorista Brauer & von Bergenstamm, 1895
Chaetocallirrhoe Townsend, 1935
Chaetocnephalia Townsend, 1915
Chaetocrania Townsend, 1915
Chaetocraniopsis Townsend, 1915
Chaetodemoticus Brauer & von Bergenstamm, 1891
Chaetodexia Mesnil, 1976
Chaetodoria Townsend, 1927
Chaetoepalpus Vimmer & Soukup, 1940
Chaetogaedia Brauer & von Bergenstamm, 1891
Chaetoglossa Townsend, 1892
Chaetogyne Brauer & von Bergenstamm, 1889
Chaetolixophaga Blanchard, 1940
Chaetona van der Wulp, 1891
Chaetonodexodes Townsend, 1916
Chaetonopsis Townsend, 1915
Chaetophorocera Townsend. 1912
Chaetophthalmus Brauer & von Bergenstamm, 1891
Chaetoplagia Coquillett, 1895
Chaetopletha Malloch, 1938
Chaetoria Becker, 1908
Chaetosisyrops Townsend, 1912
Chaetostigmoptera Townsend, 1916
Chaetosturmia Villeneuve, 1915
Chaetotheresia Townsend. 1931
Chaetovoria Villeneuve, 1920
Chaetoxynops Townsend, 1928
Charapozelia Townsend, 1927
Charitella Mesnil, 1957
Chesippus Reinhard, 1967
Chetina Rondani, 1856
Chetogaster Macquart, 1851
Chetogena Rondani, 1856
Chetoptilia Rondani, 1862
Chiloclista Townsend, 1931
Chiloepalpus Townsend, 1927
Chiricahuia Townsend, 1918
Chlorogastropsis Townsend, 1926
Chlorohystricia Townsend, 1927
Chlorolydella Townsend, 1933
Chloropales Mesnil, 1950
Chlorotachina Townsend, 1915
Choeteprosopa Macquart, 1851
Cholomyia Bigot, 1884
Chromatocera Townsend, 1915
Chromatophania Brauer & von Bergenstamm, 1889
Chromoepalpus Townsend, 1914
Chryserycia Mesnil, 1977
Chrysoexorista Townsend, 1915
Chrysohoughia Townsend, 1935
Chrysometopiops Townsend, 1916
Chrysomikia Mesnil, 1970
Chrysopasta Brauer & von Bergenstamm, 1889
Chrysophryno Townsend, 1927
Chrysophryxe Sellers, 1943
Chrysosomopsis Townsend, 1916
Chrysosturmia Townsend, 1916
Chrysotachina Brauer & von Bergenstamm, 1889
Chrysotryphera Townsend, 1935
Chyuluella van Emden, 1960
Ciala Richter, 1976
Cinochira Zetterstedt, 1845
Cistogaster Latreille, 1829
Clairvillia Robineau-Desvoidy, 1830
Clastoneura Aldrich, 1934
Clastoneuriopsis Reinhard, 1939
Clausicella Rondani, 1856
Clelimyia Herting, 1981
Clemelis Robineau-Desvoidy, 1863
Cleonice Robineau-Desvoidy, 1863
Clinogaster van der Wulp, 1892
Clytiomya Rondani, 1861
Cnephalodes Townsend, 1911
Cnephaotachina Brauer & von Bergenstamm, 1895
Cockerelliana Townsend, 1915
Cololeskia Villeneuve, 1939
Coloradomyia Arnaud, 1963
Comatacta Coquillett, 1902
Comops Aldrich, 1934
Comopsis Cortés, 1986
Compsilura Bouché, 1834
Compsiluroides Mesnil, 1953
Compsoptesis Villeneuve, 1915
Comyops van der Wulp, 1891
Comyopsis Townsend, 1919
Conactia Townsend, 1927
Conactiodoria Townsend, 1934
Conogaster Brauer & von Bergenstamm, 1891
Conopomima Mesnil, 1978
Copecrypta Townsend, 1908
Coracomyia Aldrich, 1934
Cordillerodexia Townsend, 1927
Cordyligaster Macquart, 1844
Corpulentoepalpus Townsend, 1927
Corpulentosoma Townsend, 1914
Corybantia Richter, 1986
Coscaronia Cortés, 1979
Cossidophaga Baranov, 1934
Cowania Reinhard, 1952
Crapivnicia Richter, 1995
Crassicornia Kugler, 1980
Crocinosoma Reinhard, 1947
Croesoactia Townsend, 1927
Crosskeya Shima & Chao, 1988
Crypsina Brauer & von Bergenstamm, 1889
Cryptocladocera Bezzi, 1923
Cryptomeigenia Brauer & von Bergenstamm, 1891
Cryptopalpus Rondani, 1850
Ctenophorinia Mesnil, 1963
Cubaemyiopsis Thompson, 1963
Cucuba Richter, 2008
Cuparymyia Townsend, 1934
Currana Özdikmen, 2007
Cyanogymnomma Townsend, 1927
Cyanoleskia Mesnil, 1978
Cyanopsis Townsend, 1917
Cylindromasicera Townsend, 1915
Cylindromyia Meigen, 1803
Cylindrophasia Townsend, 1916
Cyosoprocta Reinhard, 1952
Cyrtocladia van Emden, 1947
Cyrtophleba Rondani, 1856
Cyzenis Robineau-Desvoidy, 1863

D

Daetaleus Aldrich, 1928
Dallasimyia Blanchard, 1944
Dasyuromyia Bigot, 1885
Datvia Richter, 1972
Degeeriopsis Mesnil, 1953
Dejeania Robineau-Desvoidy, 1830
Dejeaniops Townsend, 1913
Dejeniopalpus Townsend, 1916
Deloblepharis Aldrich, 1934
Deltoceromyia Townsend, 1931
Deltomyza Malloch, 1931
Demoticoides Mesnil, 1953
Demoticus Macquart, 1854
Deopalpus Townsend, 1908
Desantisodes Cortés, 1973
Descampsina Mesnil, 1956
Dexia Meigen, 1826
Dexiomera Curran, 1933
Dexiomimops Townsend, 1926
Dexiosoma Rondani, 1856
Dexodomintho Townsend, 1935
Diaphanomyia Townsend, 1917
Diaphoropeza Townsend, 1908
Diaprochaeta Mesnil, 1970
Diaugia Perty, 1833
Dicarca Richter, 1993
Dichocera Williston, 1895
Diglossocera van der Wulp, 1895
Dinera Robineau-Desvoidy, 1830
Dionaea Robineau-Desvoidy, 1830
Dionomelia Kugler, 1978
Diotrephes Reinhard, 1964
Diplopota Bezzi, 1918
Dischotrichia Cortés, 1944
Distichona van der Wulp, 1890
Doleschalla Walker, 1861
Dolichocnephalia Townsend, 1915
Dolichocodia Townsend, 1908
Dolichocolon Brauer & von Bergenstamm, 1889
Dolichocoxys Townsend, 1927
Dolichodinera Townsend, 1935
Dolichogonia Townsend, 1915
Dolichopalpellus Townsend, 1927
Dolichopodomintho Townsend, 1927
Dolichostoma Townsend, 1912
Dolichotarsina Mesnil, 1977
Dolichotarsus Brooks, 1945
Doliolomyia Reinhard, 1974
Doriella Townsend, 1931
Drepanoglossa Townsend, 1891
Drino Robineau-Desvoidy, 1863
Drinomyia Mesnil, 1962
Dufouria Robineau-Desvoidy, 1830
Dumerillia Robineau-Desvoidy, 1830

E

Ebenia Macquart, 1846
Echinodexia Brauer & von Bergenstamm, 1893
Echinopyrrhosia Townsend, 1914
Echinopyrrhosiops Townsend, 1931
Ectophasia Townsend, 1912
Ectophasiopsis Townsend, 1915
Ecuadorana Townsend, 1912
Edwynia Aldrich, 1930
Effusimentum Barraclough, 1992
Egameigenia Townsend, 1927
Eggonia Brauer & von Bergenstamm, 1893
Eleodiphaga Walton, 1918
Eleuthromyia Reinhard, 1964
Elfriedella Mesnil, 1957
Eliozeta Rondani, 1856
Eloceria Robineau-Desvoidy, 1863
Elodia Robineau-Desvoidy, 1863
Elodimyia Mesnil, 1952
Elomya Robineau-Desvoidy, 1830
Embiomyia Aldrich, 1934
Empheremyia Bischof, 1904
Empheremyiops Townsend, 1927
Emporomyia Brauer & von Bergenstamm, 1891
Enchomyia Aldrich, 1934
Engeddia Kugler, 1977
Enrogalia Reinhard, 1964
Entomophaga Lioy, 1864
Eoacemyia Townsend, 1926
Eomedina Mesnil, 1960
Eomeigenielloides Reinhard, 1974
Eophyllophila Townsend, 1926
Eozenillia Townsend, 1926
Epalpellus Townsend, 1914
Epalpodes Townsend, 1912
Epalpus Rondani, 1850
Epicampocera Macquart, 1849
Epicoronimyia Blanchard, 1940
Epicuphocera Townsend, 1927
Epigrimyia Townsend, 1891
Epiphanocera Townsend, 1915
Epiplagiops Blanchard, 1943
Erebiomima Mesnil, 1953
Ergolabus Reinhard, 1964
Eribella Mesnil, 1960
Eriothrix Meigen, 1803
Eristaliomyia Townsend, 1926
Ernestiopsis Townsend, 1931
Erviopsis Townsend, 1934
Erycesta Herting, 1967
Erycia Robineau-Desvoidy, 1830
Erynnia Robineau-Desvoidy, 1830
Erynniola Mesnil, 1977
Erynniopsis Townsend, 1926
Erythroargyrops Townsend, 1917
Erythrocera Robineau-Desvoidy, 1849
Erythroepalpus Townsend, 1931
Erythromelana Townsend, 1919
Erythronychia Brauer & von Bergenstamm, 1891
Estheria Robineau-Desvoidy, 1830
Ethilla Robineau-Desvoidy, 1863
Ethylloides Verbeke, 1970
Etroga Richter, 1995
Euacaulona Townsend, 1908
Euanisia Blanchard, 1947
Euantha van der Wulp, 1885
Euanthoides Townsend, 1931
Eubischofimyia Townsend, 1927
Eucelatoria Townsend, 1909
Euceromasia Townsend, 1912
Euchaetogyne Townsend, 1908
Eucheirophaga James, 1945
Euclytia Townsend, 1908
Eucnephalia Townsend, 1892
Eucoronimyia Townsend, 1908
Eucorpulentosoma Townsend, 1914
Eudejeania Townsend, 1912
Eudexia Brauer & von Bergenstamm, 1889
Euempheremyia Townsend, 1927
Euepalpodes Townsend, 1915
Euepalpus Townsend, 1908
Euexorista Townsend, 1912
Eufabriciopsis Townsend, 1915
Eugaediopsis Townsend, 1916
Eugymnopeza Townsend, 1933
Euhalidaya Walton, 1914
Euhuascaraya Townsend, 1927
Euhygia Mesnil, 1960
Euhystricia Townsend, 1914
Eujuriniodes Townsend, 1935
Eulabidogaster Belanovsky, 1951
Eulasiona Townsend, 1892
Eulasiopalpus Townsend, 1913
Eulobomyia Woodley & Arnaud, 2008
Euloewiodoria Townsend, 1927
Euloewiopsis Townsend, 1917
Eumachaeraea Townsend, 1927
Eumacrohoughia Townsend, 1927
Eumea Robineau-Desvoidy, 1863
Eumeella Mesnil, 1939
Eumegaparia Townsend, 1908
Eumelanepalpus Townsend, 1915
Eunemorilla Townsend, 1919
Euoestrophasia Townsend, 1892
Euoestropsis Townsend, 1913
Eupododexia Villeneuve, 1915
Euptilomyia Townsend, 1939
Euptilopareia Townsend, 1916
Eurithia Robineau-Desvoidy, 1844
Eurygastropsis Townsend, 1916
Eurysthaea Robineau-Desvoidy, 1863
Eurythemyia Reinhard, 1967
Eusaundersiops Townsend, 1915
Euscopolia Townsend, 1892
Euscopoliopteryx Townsend, 1917
Eustacomyia Malloch, 1927
Eutelothyria Townsend, 1931
Euthelaira Townsend, 1912
Euthelyconychia Townsend, 1927
Euthera Loew, 1866
Euthyprosopiella Blanchard, 1963
Eutrichophora Townsend, 1915
Eutrichopoda Townsend, 1908
Eutrichopodopsis Blanchard, 1966
Eutrixa Coquillett, 1897
Eutrixoides Walton, 1913
Eutrixopsis Townsend, 1919
Euvespivora Baranov, 1942
Euwinthemia Blanchard, 1963
Everestiomyia Townsend, 1933
Evidomyia Reinhard, 1958
Exechopalpus Macquart, 1847
Exodexia Townsend, 1927
Exoernestia Townsend, 1927
Exopalpus Macquart, 1851
Exorista Meigen, 1803
Exoristoides Coquillett, 1897

F

Fabriciopsis Townsend, 1914
Fasslomyia Townsend, 1931
Fausta Robineau-Desvoidy, 1830
Feriola Mesnil, 1957
Filistea Cerretti & O’Hara in O’Hara & Cerretti, 2016
Fischeria Robineau-Desvoidy, 1830
Flavicorniculum Chao & Shi, 1981
Floradalia Thompson, 1963
Formicomyia Townsend, 1916
Formicophania Townsend, 1916
Formodexia Crosskey, 1973
Formosia Guérin-Ménevillele, 1843
Freraea Robineau-Desvoidy, 1830
Froggattimyia Townsend, 1916
Frontina Meigen, 1838
Frontiniella Townsend, 1918
Frontocnephalia Townsend, 1916
Frontodexia Mesnil, 1976

G

Gaedia Meigen, 1838
Gaediophanopsis Blanchard, 1954
Gaediopsis Brauer & von Bergenstamm, 1891
Galapagosia Curran, 1934
Galsania Richter, 1993
Ganopleuron Aldrich, 1934
Ganoproctus Aldrich, 1934
Gastrolepta Rondani, 1862
Gastroptilops Mesnil, 1957
Gemursa Barraclough, 1992
Genea Rondani, 1850
Geneodes Townsend, 1934
Genotrichia Malloch, 1938
Geraldia Malloch, 1930
Germaria Robineau-Desvoidy, 1830
Germariochaeta Villeneuve, 1937
Germariopsis Townsend, 1915
Gerocyptera Townsend, 1916
Gigamyiopsis Reinhard, 1964
Gigantoepalpus Townsend, 1913
Ginglymia Townsend, 1892
Glaurocara Thomson, 1869
Glossidionophora Bigot, 1885
Gnadochaeta Macquart, 1851
Gonatorrhina Röder, 1886
Gonia Meigen, 1803
Goniocera Brauer & von Bergenstamm, 1891
Goniochaeta Townsend, 1891
Goniophthalmus Villeneuve, 1910
Gonistylum Macquart, 1851
Gonzalezodoria Cortés, 1967
Gracilicera Miller, 1945
Graphia van der Wulp, 1885
Graphogaster Rondani, 1868
Graphotachina Malloch, 1938
Gueriniopsis Reinhard, 1943
Gymnocarcelia Townsend, 1919
Gymnochaetopsis Townsend, 1914
Gymnocheta Robineau-Desvoidy, 1830
Gymnoclytia Brauer & von Bergenstamm, 1893
Gymnoglossa Mik, 1898
Gymnomacquartia Mesnil & Shima, 1978
Gymnomma van der Wulp, 1888
Gymnommopsis Townsend, 1927
Gymnophryxe Villeneuve, 1922
Gymnosoma Meigen, 1803
Gynandromyia Bezzi, 1923

H

Halidaia Egger, 1856
Hamaxia Walker, 1860
Hamaxiella Mesnil, 1967
Hapalioloemus Baranov, 1934
Haracca Richter, 1995
Harrisia Robineau-Desvoidy, 1830
Hasmica Richter, 1972
Haywardiamyia Blanchard, 1955
Hebia Robineau-Desvoidy, 1830
Hegesinus Reinhard, 1964
Heliaea Curran, 1934
Heliconiophaga Thompson, 1966
Heliodorus Reinhard, 1964
Helioprosopa Townsend, 1927
Hemimacquartia Brauer & von Bergenstamm, 1893
Hemisturmia Townsend, 1927
Hemisturmiella Guimarães, 1983
Hemiwinthemia Villeneuve, 1938
Hemyda Robineau-Desvoidy, 1830
Heraultia Villeneuve, 1920
Hermya Robineau-Desvoidy, 1830
Hesperomyia Brauer & von Bergenstamm, 1889
Heteria Malloch, 1930
Heterometopia Macquart, 1846
Hillomyia Crosskey, 1973
Hineomyia Townsend, 1916
Homalactia Townsend, 1915
Homogenia van der Wulp, 1892
Homohypochaeta Townsend, 1927
Homosaundersia Townsend, 1931
Homosaundersiops Townsend, 1931
Homotrixa Villeneuve, 1914
Houghia Coquillett, 1897
Huascarayopsis Townsend, 1927
Huascarodexia Townsend, 1919
Hubneria Robineau-Desvoidy, 1848
Huttonobesseria Curran, 1927
Hyadesimyia Bigot, 1888
Hyalurgus Brauer & von Bergenstamm, 1893
Hygiella Mesnil, 1957
Hyleorus Aldrich, 1926
Hyosoma Aldrich, 1934
Hyperaea Robineau-Desvoidy, 1863
Hypersara Villeneuve, 1935
Hypertrophocera Townsend, 1891
Hypertrophomma Townsend, 1915
Hyphantrophaga Townsend, 1892
Hypochaetopsis Townsend, 1915
Hypodoria Townsend, 1927
Hypohoughia Townsend, 1927
Hypoproxynops Townsend, 1927
Hypovoria Villeneuve, 1912
Hypsomyia Cortés, 1983
Hystricephala Macquart, 1846
Hystrichodexia Röder, 1886
Hystricia Macquart, 1844
Hystricovoria Townsend, 1928
Hystriomyia Portschinsky, 1881
Hystrysyphona Bigot, 1859

I

Icelia Robineau-Desvoidy, 1830
Iceliopsis Guimarães, 1976
Iconofrontina Townsend, 1931
Ictericodexia Townsend, 1934
Igneomyia Mesnil, 1950
Imitomyia Townsend, 1912
Impeccantia Reinhard, 1961
Incamyia Townsend, 1912
Incamyiopsis Townsend, 1919
Intrapales Villeneuve, 1938
Irengia Townsend, 1935
Isafarus Richter, 1976
Ischyrophaga Townsend, 1915
Isidotus Reinhard, 1962
Isochaetina Mesnil, 1950
Isopexopsis Sun & Chao, 1994
Isosturmia Townsend, 1927
Istocheta Rondani, 1859
Itacnephalia Townsend, 1927
Itacuphocera Townsend, 1927
Italispidea Townsend, 1927
Italydella Townsend, 1927
Itamintho Townsend, 1931
Itaplectops Townsend, 1927
Itasaundersia Townsend, 1927
Itasturmia Townsend, 1927
Itavoria Townsend, 1931
Itaxanthomelana Townsend, 1927
Iteuthelaira Townsend, 1927

J

Jamacaria Curran, 1928
Janthinomyia Brauer & von Bergenstamm, 1893
Jurinella Brauer & von Bergenstamm, 1889
Jurinia Robineau-Desvoidy, 1830
Juriniopsis Townsend, 1916
Juriniosoma Townsend, 1927
Jurinodexia Townsend, 1915

K

Kaiseriola Mesnil, 1970
Kallisomyia Borisova, 1964
Kambaitimyia Mesnil, 1953
Kinangopana van Emden, 1960
Kiniatiliops Mesnil, 1955
Kiniatilla Villeneuve, 1938
Kirbya Robineau-Desvoidy, 1830
Klugia Robineau-Desvoidy, 1863
Koralliomyia Mesnil, 1950
Kuwanimyia Townsend, 1916

L

Labigastera Macquart, 1834
Lafuentemyia Marnef, 1965
Lambrusca Richter, 1998
Lasiona van der Wulp, 1890
Lasiopales Villeneuve, 1922
Lasiopalpus Macquart, 1847
Latiginella Villeneuve, 1936
Laufferiella Villeneuve, 1929
Lecanipa Rondani, 1859
Leiophora Robineau-Desvoidy, 1863
Leptidosophia Townsend, 1931
Leptodexia Townsend, 1919
Leptomacquartia Townsend, 1919
Leptostylum Macquart, 1851
Leptothelaira Mesnil & Shima, 1979
Leschenaultia Robineau-Desvoidy, 1830
Leskia Robineau-Desvoidy, 1830
Leskiola Mesnil, 1957
Leskiolydella Townsend, 1927
Leskiopsis Townsend, 1916
Lespesia Robineau-Desvoidy, 1863
Leucocarcelia Villeneuve, 1921
Leucostoma Meigen, 1803
Leverella Baranov, 1934
Ligeria Robineau-Desvoidy, 1863
Ligeriella Mesnil, 1961
Lindigepalpus Townsend, 1931
Lindigia Townsend, 1931
Lindneriola Mesnil, 1959
Linnaemya Robineau-Desvoidy, 1830
Lissoglossa Villeneuve, 1912
Litophasia Girschner, 1887
Lixadmontia Wood & Cave, 2006
Lixophaga Townsend, 1908
Loewia Egger, 1856
Lomachantha Rondani, 1859
Lophosia Meigen, 1824
Lophosiosoma Mesnil, 1973
Lubutana Villeneuve, 1938
Lydella Robineau-Desvoidy, 1830
Lydellina Villeneuve, 1916
Lydellothelaira Townsend, 1919
Lydina Robineau-Desvoidy, 1830
Lydinolydella Townsend, 1927
Lygaeomyia Aldrich, 1934
Lypha Robineau-Desvoidy, 1830
Lyphosia Mesnil, 1957

M

Macquartia Robineau-Desvoidy, 1830
Macrochloria Malloch, 1929
Macrohoughia Townsend, 1927
Macrohoughiopsis Townsend, 1927
Macrojurinia Townsend, 1916
Macrometopa Brauer & von Bergenstamm, 1889
Macromya Robineau-Desvoidy, 1830
Macroprosopa Brauer & von Bergenstamm, 1889
Mactomyia Reinhard, 1958
Maculosalia Mesnil, 1946
Madremyia Townsend, 1916
Magripa Richter, 1988
Mahauiella Toma, 2003
Malayia Malloch, 1926
Mallochomacquartia Townsend, 1934
Manola Richter, 1982
Manteomasiphya Guimarães, 1966
Marnefia Cortés, 1982
Marshallomyia van Emden, 1960
Masicera Macquart, 1834
Masiphya Brauer & von Bergenstamm, 1891
Masiphyoidea Thompson, 1963
Masistyloides Mesnil, 1963
Masistylum Brauer & von Bergenstamm, 1893
Mastigiomyia Reinhard, 1964
Matucania Townsend, 1919
Mauritiodoria Townsend, 1932
Mauromyia Coquillett, 1897
Mayodistichona Townsend, 1928
Mayoschizocera Townsend, 1927
Medina Robineau-Desvoidy, 1830
Medinella Dugdale, 1969
Medinodexia Townsend, 1927
Medinomyia Mesnil, 1957
Medinophyto Townsend, 1927
Medinospila Mesnil, 1977
Mediosetiger Barraclough, 1983
Megaparia van der Wulp, 1891
Megapariopsis Townsend, 1915
Megaprosopus Macquart, 1844
Megistogastropsis Townsend, 1916
Mehmetia Özdikmen, 2007
Meigenia Robineau-Desvoidy, 1830
Meigenielloides Townsend, 1919
Melanasomyia Malloch, 1935
Melanepalpellus Townsend, 1927
Melanepalpus Townsend, 1914
Melanesomyia Barraclough, 1998
Melanophrys Williston, 1886
Melanorlopteryx Townsend, 1927
Melanoromintho Townsend, 1935
Melanorophasia Townsend, 1934
Meledonus Aldrich, 1926
Meleterus Aldrich, 1926
Melisoneura Rondani, 1861
Mellachnus Aldrich, 1934
Mendelssohnia Kugler, 1971
Mesembrierigone Townsend, 1931
Mesembrinormia Townsend, 1931
Mesnilana van Emden, 1945
Mesniletta Herting, 1979
Mesnilisca Zimin, 1974
Mesnilius Özdikmen, 2006
Mesnilomyia Kugler, 1972
Mesnilotrix Cerretti & O’Hara in O’Hara & Cerretti, 2016
Mesnilus Özdikmen, 2007
Metacemyia Herting, 1969
Metadrinomyia Shima, 1980
Metamyiophasia Blanchard, 1966
Metamyobia Townsend, 1927
Metaphorocera Thompson, 1968
Metaphryno Crosskey, 1967
Metaplagia Coquillett, 1895
Metopiopsis Vimmer & Soukup, 1940
Metopoactia Townsend, 1927
Metopomuscopteryx Townsend, 1915
Miamimyia Townsend, 1916
Miamimyiops Townsend, 1939
Microaporia Townsend, 1919
Microcerophina Kugler, 1977
Microchaetina van der Wulp, 1891
Microchaetogyne Townsend, 1931
Microgymnomma Townsend, 1916
Microhystricia Malloch, 1938
Micromasiphya Townsend, 1934
Micronychia Brauer & von Bergenstamm, 1889
Micronychiops Townsend, 1915
Microphthalma Macquart, 1844
Microplagia Townsend, 1915
Microsillus Aldrich, 1926
Microsoma Macquart, 1855
Microtropesa Macquart, 1846
Mikia Kowarz, 1885
Milada Richter, 1973
Mintho Robineau-Desvoidy, 1830
Minthodes Brauer & von Bergenstamm, 1889
Minthodexiopsis Townsend, 1927
Mintholeskia Townsend, 1934
Minthoplagia Townsend, 1915
Minthopsis Townsend, 1915
Minthotachina Townsend, 1935
Minthoxia Mesnil, 1968
Mitannia Herting, 1987
Mochlosoma Brauer & von Bergenstamm, 1889
Mongolomintho Richter, 1976
Monoleptophaga Baranov, 1938
Montanarturia Miller, 1945
Montanothalma Barraclough, 1996
Montserratia Thompson, 1964
Montuosa Chao & Zhou, 1996
Moreiria Townsend, 1932
Morphodexia Townsend, 1931
Munira Richter, 1974
Muscopteryx Townsend, 1892
Myatelemus Reinhard, 1967
Mycteromyiella Mesnil, 1966
Myiochaeta Cortés, 1967
Myioclura Reinhard, 1974
Myiodexia Cortés & Campos, 1971
Myiomima Brauer & von Bergenstamm, 1889
Myiomintho Brauer & von Bergenstamm, 1889
Myiopharus Brauer & von Bergenstamm, 1889
Myiophasiomima Blanchard, 1966
Myiophasiopsis Townsend, 1927
Myioscotiptera Giglio-Tos, 1893
Myiosturmiopsis Thompson, 1963
Myiotrixa Brauer & von Bergenstamm, 1893
Myobiomima Townsend, 1926
Myostoma Robineau-Desvoidy, 1830
Myothyriopsis Townsend, 1919
Mystacella van der Wulp, 1890
Mystacomyia Giglio-Tos, 1893
Mystacomyoidea Thompson, 1963
Myxarchiclops Villeneuve, 1916
Myxexoristops Townsend, 1911
Myxophryxe Cerretti & O’Hara in O’Hara & Cerretti, 2016

N

Naira Richter, 1970
Nanoplagia Villeneuve, 1929
Neaera Robineau-Desvoidy, 1830
Nealsomyia Mesnil, 1939
Neaphria Townsend, 1914
Nemoraea Robineau-Desvoidy, 1830
Nemorilla Rondani, 1856
Nemorilloides Brauer & von Bergenstamm, 1891
Neoargyrophylax Townsend, 1927
Neobrachelia Townsend, 1931
Neocampylochaeta Townsend, 1927
Neochaetoplagia Blanchard, 1963
Neocraspedothrix Townsend, 1927
Neocuphocera Townsend, 1927
Neocyrtophoeba Vimmer & Soukup, 1940
Neoemdenia Mesnil, 1953
Neoerythronychia Malloch, 1932
Neoeuantha Townsend, 1931
Neogymnomma Townsend, 1915
Neolophosia Townsend, 1939
Neolydella Mesnil, 1939
Neomasiphya Guimarães, 1966
Neomedina Malloch, 1935
Neometachaeta Townsend, 1915
Neomintho Brauer & von Bergenstamm, 1891
Neominthoidea Thompson, 1968
Neominthopsis Townsend, 1915
Neomyostoma Townsend, 1935
Neopaedarium Blanchard, 1943
Neophasmophaga Guimarães, 1982
Neophryxe Townsend, 1916
Neoplectops Malloch, 1930
Neopodomyia Townsend, 1927
Neosolieria Townsend, 1927
Neosophia Guimarães, 1982
Neossarromyia Townsend, 1927
Neotachina Malloch, 1938
Neotrafoiopsis Townsend, 1931
Neotryphera Malloch, 1938
Neoxanthobasis Blanchard, 1966
Neozelia Guimarães, 1975
Nephochaetona Townsend, 1919
Nephoplagia Townsend, 1919
Nepocarcelia Townsend, 1927
Nepophasmophaga Townsend, 1927
Neximyia Crosskey, 1967
Nicephorus Reinhard, 1944
Nigara Richter, 1999
Nigrilypha O’Hara, 2002
Nilea Robineau-Desvoidy, 1863
Nimioglossa Reinhard, 1945
Nothovoria Cortés & González, 1989
Notoderus Cortés, 1986
Notodytes Aldrich, 1934
Notomanes Aldrich, 1934

O

Oberonomyia Reinhard, 1964
Oblitoneura Mesnil, 1975
Obscuromyia Barraclough & O’Hara, 1998
Occisor Hutton, 1901
Ochrocera Townsend, 1916
Ochroepalpus Townsend, 1927
Ocypteromima Townsend, 1916
Ocyrtosoma Townsend, 1912
Ocytata Gistel, 1848
Oedemamedina Townsend, 1927
Oestrohystricia Townsend, 1912
Oestrophasia Brauer & von Bergenstamm, 1889
Oligoestrus Townsend. 1932
Olinda Robineau-Desvoidy, 1830
Ollachactia Townsend, 1927
Ollachea Townsend, 1919
Ollacheryphe Townsend, 1927
Onychogonia Brauer & von Bergenstamm, 1889
Oomasicera Townsend, 1911
Opesia Robineau-Desvoidy, 1863
Ophirion Townsend, 1911
Ophirodexia Townsend, 1911
Ophirosturmia Townsend, 1911
Opsoempheria Townsend, 1927
Opsomeigenia Townsend, 1919
Opsophagus Aldrich, 1926
Opsophasiopteryx Townsend, 1917
Opsosturmia Townsend, 1927
Opsotheresia Townsend, 1919
Opsozelia Townsend, 1919
Opticopteryx Townsend, 1931
Oraeosoma Cortés, 1976
Oraphasmophaga Reinhard, 1958
Orasturmia Reinhard, 1947
Orestilla Reinhard, 1944
Ormia Robineau-Desvoidy, 1830
Ormiophasia Townsend, 1919
Orohoughia Townsend, 1934
Oromasiphya Townsend, 1927
Orthosimyia Reinhard, 1944
Ossidingia Townsend, 1919
Ostracophyto Townsend, 1915
Oswaldia Robineau-Desvoidy, 1863
Otomasicera Townsend, 1912
Oxyaporia Townsend, 1919
Oxyepalpus Townsend, 1927
Oxymedoria Villeneuve, 1916
Oxynops Townsend, 1912
Oxyphyllomyia Villeneuve, 1937

P

Pachymyia Macquart, 1843
Pachynocera Townsend, 1919
Pachystylum Macquart, 1848
Paedarium Aldrich, 1926
Pales Robineau-Desvoidy, 1830
Palesisa Villeneuve, 1929
Palia Curran, 1927
Paliana Curran, 1927
Palmonia Kugler, 1972
Palpolinnaemyia Townsend, 1927
Palpostoma Robineau-Desvoidy, 1830
Palpotachina Townsend, 1915
Palpozenillia Townsend, 1934
Pammaerus Aldrich, 1927
Pandelleia Villeneuve, 1907
Panzeria Robineau-Desvoidy, 1830
Parabothria Vimmer & Soukup, 1940
Parabrachycoma Blanchard, 1940
Parachaetolyga Bischof, 1904
Paraclara Bezzi, 1908
Paradejeania Brauer & von Bergenstamm, 1893
Paradidyma Brauer & von Bergenstamm, 1891
Paradrino Mesnil, 1949
Paralypha Mesnil, 1963
Paramesochaeta Brauer & von Bergenstamm, 1891
Parapales Mesnil, 1950
Parapexopsis Mesnil, 1953
Paraphasiopsis Townsend, 1917
Paraphasmophaga Townsend, 1915
Parapoliops Blanchard, 1957
Pararchytas Brauer & von Bergenstamm, 1895
Pararondania Villeneuve, 1916
Pararrhinactia Townsend, 1935
Parasetigena Brauer & von Bergenstamm, 1891
Paratachina Brauer & von Bergenstamm, 1891
Paratrixa Brauer & von Bergenstamm, 1891
Paratropeza Paramonov, 1964
Paratryphera Brauer & von Bergenstamm, 1891
Paravibrissina Shima, 1979
Paraxanthobasis Blanchard, 1966
Parazelia Townsend, 1919
Parechinotachina Townsend, 1931
Parepalpus Coquillett, 1902
Parerigone Brauer, 1898
Pareupogona Townsend, 1916
Parhamaxia Mesnil, 1967
Parodomyiops Townsend, 1935
Paropesia Mesnil, 1970
Paropsivora Malloch, 1934
Parthenoleskia Townsend, 1941
Patelloa Townsend, 1916
Patillalia Curran, 1934
Patulifrons Barraclough, 1992
Paulipalpus Barraclough, 1992
Pelamera Herting, 1969
Pelashyria Villeneuve, 1935
Pelatachina Meade, 1894
Pelecotheca Townsend, 1919
Peleteria Robineau-Desvoidy, 1830
Pelycops Aldrich, 1934
Pennapoda Townsend, 1897
Pentatomophaga de Meijere, 1917
Penthosia van der Wulp, 1892
Penthosiosoma Townsend, 1926
Peracroglossa Townsend, 1931
Peremptor Hutton, 1901
Periarchiclops Villeneuve, 1924
Peribaea Robineau-Desvoidy, 1863
Perigymnosoma Villeneuve, 1929
Perioptichochaeta Townsend, 1927
Periostoma Cortés, 1986
Periscepsia Gistel, 1848
Peristasisea Villeneuve, 1934
Perrissina Malloch, 1938
Perrissinoides Dugdale, 1962
Persedea Richter, 2001
Perumyia Arnaud, 1963
Petagnia Rondani, 1856
Peteina Meigen, 1838
Petrargyrops Townsend, 1927
Pexopsis Brauer & von Bergenstamm, 1889
Phaeodema Aldrich, 1934
Phalacrophyto Townsend, 1915
Phania Meigen, 1824
Phantasiomyia Townsend, 1915
Phaoniella Malloch, 1938
Phasia Latreille, 1804
Phasiatacta Townsend, 1911
Phasiocyptera Townsend, 1927
Phasioormia Townsend, 1933
Phasiophyto Townsend, 1919
Phasiops Coquillett, 1899
Phasmofrontina Townsend, 1931
Phasmophaga Townsend, 1909
Phebellia Robineau-Desvoidy, 1846
Philippodexia Townsend, 1926
Philocorus Cortés, 1976
Phobetromyia Reinhard, 1964
Phonomyia Brauer & von Bergenstamm, 1893
Phorcidella Mesnil, 1946
Phorinia Robineau-Desvoidy, 1830
Phorocera Robineau-Desvoidy, 1830
Phorocerosoma Townsend, 1927
Phorocerostoma Malloch, 1930
Phosocephala Townsend, 1908
Phryno Robineau-Desvoidy, 1830
Phrynotachina Townsend, 1927
Phryxe Robineau-Desvoidy, 1830
Phyllaristomyia Townsend, 1931
Phyllomya Robineau-Desvoidy, 1830
Phyllophilopsis Townsend, 1915
Phyllophryno Townsend, 1927
Phytomyptera Rondani, 1844
Phytomypterina van Emden, 1960
Phytorophaga Bezzi, 1923
Picconia Robineau-Desvoidy, 1863
Pictoepalpus Townsend, 1915
Piligena van Emden, 1947
Piligenoides Barraclough, 1985
Pilimyia Malloch, 1930
Pimelimyia Mesnil, 1949
Piriona Aldrich, 1928
Pirionimyia Townsend, 1931
Piximactia Townsend, 1927
Plagimasicera Townsend, 1915
Plagiocoma Villeneuve, 1916
Plagiomima Brauer & von Bergenstamm, 1891
Plagiomyia Curran, 1927
Planomyia Aldrich, 1934
Platydexia van Emden, 1954
Platymya Robineau-Desvoidy, 1830
Platyrrhinodexia Townsend, 1927
Platyschineria Villeneuve, 1942
Platytachina Malloch, 1938
Platytainia Macquart, 1851
Plectopsis Townsend, 1927
Plesina Meigen, 1838
Plesiodexilla Blanchard, 1966
Plethochaetigera Malloch, 1938
Pododexia Brauer & von Bergenstamm, 1889
Podosturmia Townsend, 1928
Policheta Rondani, 1856
Poliops Aldrich, 1934
Polistiopsis Townsend, 1915
Polybiocyptera Guimarães, 1979
Polychaeta Macquart, 1851
Polygaster van der Wulp, 1890
Polygastropteryx Mesnil, 1953
Porphyromus van Emden, 1960
Pradocania Tschorsnig, 1997
Pretoriamyia Curran, 1927
Pretoriana Curran, 1938
Procarcelia Townsend, 1927
Proceromyia Mesnil, 1957
Procleonice Townsend, 1935
Prodegeeria Brauer & von Bergenstamm, 1895
Prodemoticus Villeneuve, 1919
Prodiaphania Townsend, 1927
Proleskia Townsend, 1927
Proleskiomima Townsend, 1934
Prolophosia Townsend, 1933
Prolypha Townsend, 1934
Promegaparia Townsend, 1931
Prometopiops Townsend, 1927
Promintho Townsend, 1926
Pronemorilla Townsend, 1935
Prooppia Townsend, 1926
Proparachaeta Townsend, 1928
Proparachaetopsis Blanchard, 1942
Prophasiopsis Townsend, 1927
Prophorostoma Townsend, 1927
Prorhynchops Brauer & von Bergenstamm, 1891
Proriedelia Mesnil, 1953
Proroglutea Townsend, 1919
Proscissio Hutton, 1901
Prosena Lepeletier & Serville, 1828
Prosenactia Blanchard, 1940
Prosenina Malloch, 1930
Prosenoides Brauer & von Bergenstamm, 1891
Prosenosoma Malloch, 1938
Prosethilla Herting, 1984
Prosheliomyia Brauer & von Bergenstamm, 1891
Prosopea Rondani, 1861
Prosopochaeta Macquart, 1851
Prosopofrontina Townsend, 1926
Prospalaea Aldrich, 1925
Prospanipalpus Townsend, 1931
Prospherysa van der Wulp, 1890
Prospherysodoria Townsend, 1928
Prosuccingulum Mesnil, 1959
Protaporia Townsend, 1919
Protodejeania Townsend, 1915
Protogoniops Townsend, 1913
Protogoniopsis Townsend, 1915
Protohystricia Malloch, 1929
Protonotodytes Blanchard, 1966
Protrichoprosopis Blanchard, 1966
Protypophaemyia Blanchard, 1963
Proxanthobasis Blanchard, 1966
Psalidoxena Villeneuve, 1941
Psecacera Bigot, 1880
Pseudalsomyia Mesnil, 1968
Pseudobombyliomyia Townsend, 1931
Pseudobrullaea Mesnil, 1957
Pseudochaeta Coquillett, 1895
Pseudochaetona Townsend, 1919
Pseudodexia Brauer & von Bergenstamm, 1891
Pseudodexilla O'Hara, Shima & Zhang, 2009
Pseudodinera Brauer & von Bergenstamm, 1891
Pseudogonia Brauer & von Bergenstamm, 1889
Pseudomasiphya Thompson, 1963
Pseudominthodes Townsend, 1933
Pseudopachystylum Mik, 1891
Pseudoperichaeta Brauer & von Bergenstamm, 1889
Pseudoredtenbacheria Brauer & von Bergenstamm, 1889
Pseudorrhinactia Thompson, 1968
Pseudosiphosturmia Thompson, 1966
Pseudosturmia Thompson, 1966
Pseudoviviania Brauer & von Bergenstamm, 1891
Pseudoxanthozona Townsend, 1931
Pseudoxanthozonella Townsend, 1931
Pterotopeza Townsend, 1908
Ptesiomyia Brauer & von Bergenstamm, 1893
Ptilocatagonia Mesnil, 1956
Ptilodegeeria Brauer & von Bergenstamm, 1891
Ptilodexia Brauer & von Bergenstamm, 1889
Ptilogonia Bischof, 1904
Ptilomyiopsis Townsend, 1933
Ptilomyoides Curran, 1928
Punamyia Townsend, 1915
Punamyocera Townsend, 1919
Pygidimyia Crosskey, 1967
Pygocalcager Townsend, 1935
Pyrrhodexia Townsend, 1931
Pyrrhoernestia Townsend, 1931
Pyrrhotachina Townsend, 1931

Q

Quadra Malloch, 1929
Quadratosoma Townsend, 1914

R

 Ramonda Robineau-Desvoidy, 1830
Ramonella Kugler, 1980
Rasiliverpa Barraclough, 1992
Redtenbacheria Schiner, 1861
Reichardia Karsch, 1886
Rhachoepalpus Townsend, 1908
Rhachosaundersia Townsend, 1931
Rhacodinella Mesnil, 1968
Rhamphina Macquart, 1835
Rhamphinina Bigot, 1885
Rhaphiochaeta Brauer & von Bergenstamm, 1889
Rhinaplomyia Mesnil, 1955
Rhinomacquartia Brauer & von Bergenstamm, 1891
Rhinomyobia Brauer & von Bergenstamm, 1893
Rhinomyodes Townsend, 1933
Rhombothyria van der Wulp, 1891
Rhombothyriops Townsend, 1915
Rhynchogonia Brauer & von Bergenstamm, 1893
Richteriola Mesnil, 1963
Ricosia Curran, 1927
Riedelia Mesnil, 1942
Rioteria Herting, 1973
Robinaldia Herting, 1983
Rondania Robineau-Desvoidy, 1850
Rondaniooestrus Villeneuve, 1916
Rossimyiops Mesnil, 1953
Ruiziella Cortés, 1951
Rutilia Robineau-Desvoidy, 1830
Rutilodexia Townsend, 1915
Rutilotrixa Townsend, 1933

S

Saralba Walker, 1865
Sarcocalirrhoe Townsend, 1928
Sarcoprosena Townsend, 1927
Sarrorhina Villeneuve, 1936
Sarromyia Pokorny, 1893
Saundersiops Townsend, 1914
Scaphimyia Mesnil, 1953
Schembria Rondani, 1861
Schineria Rondani, 1857
Schistostephana Townsend, 1919
Schiziotachina Walker, 1852
Schizolinnaea van Emden, 1960
Schlingermyia Cortés, 1967
Schwarzalia Curran, 1934
Scomma Richter, 1972
Scotiptera Macquart, 1835
Semisuturia Malloch, 1927
Senometopia Macquart, 1834
Senostoma Macquart, 1847
Sepseocara Richter, 1986
Sericodoria Townsend. 1928
Sericotachina Townsend, 1916
Sericozenillia Mesnil, 1957
Setalunula Chao & Yang, 1990
Setolestes Aldrich, 1934
Shannonomyiella Townsend, 1939
Signosoma Townsend, 1914
Signosomopsis Townsend, 1914
Simoma Aldrich, 1926
Siphoactia Townsend, 1927
Siphocrocuta Townsend, 1935
Siphona Meigen, 1803
Siphosturmia Coquillett, 1897
Sisyphomyia Townsend, 1927
Sisyropa Brauer & von Bergenstamm, 1889
Sitellitergus Reinhard, 1964
Smidtia Robineau-Desvoidy, 1830
Solieria Robineau-Desvoidy, 1849
Solomonilla Özdikmen, 2007
Sonaca Richter, 1981
Sophia Robineau-Desvoidy, 1830
Sophiella Guimarães, 1982
Sorochemyia Townsend, 1915
Spallanzania Robineau-Desvoidy, 1830
Spathidexia Townsend, 1912
Spathipalpus Rondani, 1863
Sphaerina van der Wulp, 1890
Spilochaetosoma Smith, 1917
Spiniabdomina Shi, 1991
Spiroglossa Doleschall, 1858
Squamomedina Townsend, 1934
Stackelbergomyia Rohdendorf, 1948
Staurochaeta Brauer & von Bergenstamm, 1889
Steatosoma Aldrich, 1934
Steleoneura Stein, 1924
Stenodexia van der Wulp, 1891
Stenosturmia Townsend, 1927
Stiremania Cerretti & O’Hara in O’Hara & Cerretti, 2016
Stolatosoma Reinhard, 1953
Stomatodexia Brauer & von Bergenstamm, 1889
Stomatotachina Townsend, 1931
Stomina Robineau-Desvoidy, 1830
Strongygaster Macquart, 1834
Stuardomyia Cortés, 1945
Sturmia Robineau-Desvoidy, 1830
Sturmiellina Thompson, 1963
Sturmimasiphya Townsend, 1935
Sturmioactia Townsend, 1926
Sturmiodexia Townsend, 1919
Sturmiomima Townsend, 1934
Sturmiopsis Townsend, 1916
Sturmiopsoidea Thompson, 1966
Subclytia Pandellé, 1894
Subfischeria Villeneuve, 1937
Succingulodes Townsend, 1935
Suensonomyia Mesnil, 1953
Sumichrastia Townsend, 1916
Sumpigaster Macquart, 1855
Symmorphomyia Mesnil & Shima, 1977
Synactia Villeneuve, 1916
Synamphichaeta Villeneuve, 1936
Syringosoma Townsend, 1917

T

Tachina Meigen, 1803
Tachineo Malloch, 1938
Tachinoestrus Portschinsky, 1887
Tachinomyia Townsend, 1892
Tachinophasia Townsend, 1931
Takanoella Baranov, 1935
Takanomyia Mesnil, 1957
Talarocera Williston, 1888
Tapajohoughia Townsend. 1934
Tapajoleskia Townsend, 1934
Tapajosia Townsend, 1934
Taperamyia Townsend, 1935
Tarassus Aldrich, 1933
Tarpessita Reinhard, 1967
Tasmaniomyia Townsend, 1916
Technamyia Reinhard, 1974
Telodytes Aldrich, 1934
Telonotomyia Cortés, 1986
Telothyria van der Wulp, 1890
Teretrophora Macquart, 1851
Tesseracephalus Reinhard, 1955
Tetragimyia Shima & Takahashi, 2011
Tetragrapha Brauer & von Bergenstamm, 1891
Tettigoniophaga Guimarães, 1978
Thecocarcelia Townsend, 1933
Thelaira Robineau-Desvoidy, 1830
Thelairaporia Guimarães, 1980
Thelairochaetona Townsend, 1919
Thelairodes van der Wulp, 1891
Thelairodoria Townsend, 1927
Thelairodoriopsis Thompson, 1968
Thelairodrino Mesnil, 1954
Thelairoleskia Townsend, 1926
Thelairophasia Townsend, 1919
Thelairosoma Villeneuve, 1916
Thelyconychia Brauer & von Bergenstamm, 1889
Thelymorpha Brauer & von Bergenstamm, 1889
Thelymyia Brauer & von Bergenstamm, 1891
Thelyoxynops Townsend, 1927
Therobia Brauer, 1862
Thrixion Brauer & von Bergenstamm, 1889
Thryptodexia Malloch, 1926
Thysanopsis Townsend, 1917
Thysanosturmia Townsend, 1927
Tipulidomima Townsend, 1933
Tlephusa Robineau-Desvoidy, 1863
Tlpuloleskia Townsend, 1931
Topomeigenia Townsend, 1919
Torocca Walker, 1859
Torosomyia Reinhard, 1935
Tothillia Crosskey, 1976
Townsendiellomyia Baranov, 1932
Toxocnemis Macquart, 1855
Trafoia Brauer & von Bergenstamm, 1893
Trepophrys Townsend. 1908
Triarthria Stephens, 1829
Trichactia Stein, 1924
Trichinochaeta Townsend, 1917
Trichoceronia Cortes, 1945
Trichodischia Bigot, 1885
Trichodura Macquart, 1843
Trichoepalpus Townsend, 1914
Trichoformosomyia Baranov, 1934
Trichophora Macquart, 1847
Trichophoropsis Townsend, 1914
Trichopoda Berthold, 1827
Trichoprosopus Macquart, 1843
Trichopyrrhosia Townsend, 1927
Trichoraea Cortés, 1974
Trichosaundersia Townsend, 1914
Trichostylum Macquart, 1851
Trichotopteryx Townsend, 1919
Trichschizotachina Townsend, 1935d
Trigonospila Pokorny, 1886
Trinitodexia Townsend, 1935
Triodontopyga Townsend, 1927
Trischidocera Villeneuve, 1915
Trismegistomya Reinhard, 1967
Tritaxys Macquart, 1847
Trixa Meigen, 1824
Trixiceps Villeneuve, 1936
Trixoclea Villeneuve, 1916
Trixodes Coquillett, 1902
Trixodopsis Townsend, 1933
Trixomorpha Brauer & von Bergenstamm, 1889
Trochilochaeta Townsend, 1940
Trochilodes Coquillett, 1903
Trochiloglossa Townsend, 1919
Trochiloleskia Townsend, 1917
Tromodesiana Townsend, 1931
Tromodesiopsis Townsend, 1927
Tropidodexia Townsend, 1915
Tropidopsiomorpha Townsend, 1927
Truphia Malloch, 1930
Tryphera Meigen, 1838
Trypherina Malloch, 1938
Tsugaea Hall, 1939
Tunapunia Thompson, 1963
Turanogonia Rohdendorf, 1924
Tylodexia Townsend, 1926
Tyreomma Brauer & von Bergenstamm, 1891

U

Ucayalimyia Townsend. 1927
Uclesia Girschner, 1901
Uclesiella Malloch, 1938
Ugimeigenia Townsend, 1916
Uramya Robineau-Desvoidy, 1830
Uraporia Townsend, 1919
Urodexia Osten-Sacken, 1882
Urodexiomima Townsend, 1927
Uroeuantha Townsend, 1927
Uromedina Townsend, 1926
Ursophyto Aldrich, 1926
Urucurymyia Townsend, 1934
Uruhuasia Townsend, 1914
Uruhuasiopsis Townsend, 1915
Uruleskia Townsend, 1934
Urumyobia Townsend, 1934
Ushpayacua Townsend, 1928

V

Vanderwulpella Townsend, 1919
Vanderwulpia Townsend, 1891
Velardemyia Valencia, 1972
Veluta Malloch, 1938
Verrugomyia Townsend, 1927
Verrugophryno Townsend, 1927
Vertepalpus Curran, 1947
Vibrissina Rondani, 1861
Vibrissoepalpus Townsend, 1915
Vibrissomyia Townsend, 1912
Vibrissovoria Townsend, 1919
Villanovia Strobl, 1910
Visayalydina Townsend, 1926
Voria Robineau-Desvoidy, 1830
Voriella Malloch, 1930

W

Wagneria Robineau-Desvoidy, 1830
Wardarina Mesnil, 1953
Wattia Malloch, 1938
Weberia Robineau-Desvoidy, 1830
Weingaertneriella Baranov, 1932
Winthellia Crosskey, 1967
Winthemia Robineau-Desvoidy, 1830

X

Xanthobasis Aldrich, 1934
Xanthodexia van der Wulp, 1891
Xanthoepalpodes Townsend, 1913
Xanthoepalpus Townsend, 1914
Xanthomelanodes Townsend, 1893
Xanthomelanopsis Townsend, 1917
Xanthomera Hampson, 1914, 1908
Xanthooestrus Villeneuve, 1914
Xanthopelta Aldrich, 1934
Xanthophyto Townsend, 1916
Xanthopteromyia Townsend, 1926
Xanthotheresia Townsend, 1931
Xenoplagia Townsend, 1914
Xenorhynchia Malloch, 1938
Xeoprosopa Townsend, 1919
Xiphochaeta Mesnil, 1968
Xylocamptomima Townsend, 1927
Xylotachina Brauer & von Bergenstamm, 1891
Xysta Meigen, 1824

Y

Yahuarmayoia Townsend, 1927
Ypophaemyiops Townsend, 1935

Z

Zaira Robineau-Desvoidy, 1830
Zambesa Walker, 1856
Zambesomima Mesnil, 1967
Zamimus Malloch, 1932
Zealandotachina Malloch, 1938
Zebromyia Malloch, 1929
Zelia Robineau-Desvoidy, 1830
Zelindopsis Anonymous, 1946
Zeliomima Mesnil, 1976
Zenargomyia Crosskey, 1964
Zenillia Robineau-Desvoidy, 1830
Zeuxia Meigen, 1826
Zeuxiotrix Mesnil, 1976
Ziminia Mesnil, 1963
Zita Curran, 1927
Zizyphomyia Townsend, 1916
Zonalia Curran, 1934
Zonoepalpus Townsend, 1927
Zophomyia Macquart, 1835
Zosteromeigenia Townsend, 1919
Zygobothria Mik, 1891
Zygozenillia Townsend, 1927

References 

L
Tachinidae